The fifth season of the Israeli television series HaShminiya premiered on June 15, 2014 on Arutz HaYeladim (HOT).

Episodes

{| class="wikitable plainrowheaders" style="width:100%; margin:auto; background:white;"
|-
! style="background-color: #979797; color:White; text-align: center;" width="35"|Series# 
!! style="background-color: #979797; color:White; text-align: center;" width="35"|Season# 
!! style="background-color: #979797; color:White; text-align: center;"|Title
!! style="background-color: #979797; color:White; text-align: center;" width="140"|Original airdate

|}

References

2014 Israeli television seasons